The 2013 Fresno State Bulldogs football team represented California State University, Fresno in the 2013 NCAA Division I FBS football season. The Bulldogs were by second-year head coach Tim DeRuyter and played their home games at Bulldog Stadium. They were members of the Mountain West Conference in the West Division. They finished the season 11–2, 7–1 in Mountain West play to win the West Division. They defeated Utah State in the inaugural  Mountain West Championship Game to be crowned Mountain West champions. They were invited to the Las Vegas Bowl where they were defeated by USC.

Personnel

Coaching staff

Roster

Depth chart

Schedule

 September 15's game against Colorado was canceled due to effects from the Boulder Creek flash floods.

Game summaries

Rutgers

Cal Poly

at Colorado

This game was canceled due to effects from the Boulder Creek flash floods.

Boise State

at Hawaii

at Idaho

UNLV

at San Diego State

Nevada

at Wyoming

New Mexico

at San Jose State

Utah State

USC–Las Vegas Bowl

USC technically vacated the win in 2005. This is the second time the two teams have met in a bowl game with the other coming in the 1992 Freedom Bowl. Tracy Jones of the American Athletic Conference is the referee.

1st quarter scoring: USC - Marqise Lee 10-yard pass from Cody Kessler (Andre Heidari kick); FS - Isaiah Burse 8-yard pass from Derek Carr (Colin McGuire kick blocked); USC - Nelson Agholor 40-yard pass from Kessler (Heidari kick)

2nd quarter scoring: USC - Agholor 17-yard pass from Kessler (Heidari kick); USC - Javorius Allen 24-yard run (Heidari kick); USC - Lee 40-yard pass from Kessler (Heidari kick)

3rd quarter scoring: FS - Davante Adams 23-yard pass from Carr (McGuire kick); USC - Heidari 39-yard field goal

4th quarter scoring: FS - Derron Smith 41-yard interception return (McGuire kick) ; USC - Allen 1-yard run (Heidari kick)

Statistics
Derek Carr 424/605, 4866 Yds, 50 TD, 8 INT

Rankings

References

Fresno State
Fresno State Bulldogs football seasons
Mountain West Conference football champion seasons
Fresno State Bulldogs football